Carleton Opgaard (February 18, 1929 – July 6, 2014) was an American college and university administrator and founding president of Vancouver Island University.

Early life and education
Carleton Myron Opgaard was born in Fort Ransom, North Dakota, the son of immigrants from Norway. Opgaard obtained his bachelor's degree from Valley City State University in Valley City, North Dakota in 1952. Thereafter, he received his master's degree from the University of Wyoming in Laramie and his Ph.D. from the University of Washington in Seattle. He attended the University of Oslo in Norway as a Fulbright scholar.

Career 
In his initial administrative assignment, Opgaard was principal of Edmonds Woodway High School in Edmonds, Washington.

In 1969, he was the founding president of Malaspina University-College, now called Vancouver Island University in Nanaimo, British Columbia, Canada. During the centennial of the college, he was the president of Dakota State University (1978–1983) in Madison, South Dakota. He also served as president of Tacoma Community College in Tacoma, Washington, (1983–1990). He later served as interim president of Columbia Basin College and Edmonds College in Washington.

For his service to education, Carleton Opgaard received the Distinguished Alumnus Award from Valley City State University.

Death 
Opgaard died on July 6, 2014 in Tacoma, Washington.

Selected works
Waldemar Theodor Ager, Norwegian immigrant author in America (University of Wyoming, 1957)

References

People from Ransom County, North Dakota
University of Washington alumni
Heads of universities and colleges in the United States
University of Wyoming alumni
1929 births
2014 deaths
Academic staff of Vancouver Island University
American people of Norwegian descent
Valley City State University alumni